Mahadji Scindia Sports Complex is a multipurpose sports complex located in Gwalior, Madhya Pradesh, India. The stadium is managed and owned by Jiwaji University.

The stadium has facilities for cricket, football, and hockey. There are also facilities for indoor sports such as  basketball, badminton, gymnastics, handball, volleyball, lawn tennis, table tennis, weight lifting, and kabaddi.

The stadium has hosted some non-first-class cricket matches.

References

External links 
 Cricketarchive
 Wikimapia

Cricket grounds in Madhya Pradesh
Sports venues in Madhya Pradesh
Gwalior
Buildings and structures in Gwalior
Multi-purpose stadiums in India
University sports venues in India
Jiwaji University
Sports venues in Gwalior
Educational institutions in India with year of establishment missing